Barea is a Basque surname. Notable people with the surname include:

Ainize Barea Nuñez (born 1992), Spanish footballer
Arturo Barea (1897–1957), Spanish journalist, broadcaster and writer
Juan Barea (born 1931), Argentine basketball player
José Juan Barea (born 1984), Puerto Rican basketball player
María Carmen Barea (born 1966), Spanish field hockey player
Stephan Barea (born 1991), Puerto Rican footballer

Basque-language surnames